The African Charter on Human and Peoples' Rights (also known as the Banjul Charter) is an international human rights instrument  that is intended to promote and protect human rights and basic freedoms in the African continent.

It emerged under the aegis of the Organisation of African Unity (since replaced by the  African Union) which, at its 1979 Assembly of Heads of State and Government, adopted a resolution calling for the creation of a committee of experts to draft a continent-wide human rights instrument, similar to those that already existed in Europe (European Convention on Human Rights) and the Americas (American Convention on Human Rights). This committee was duly set up, and it produced a draft that was unanimously approved at the OAU's 18th Assembly held in June 1981, in Nairobi, Kenya. Pursuant to its Article 63 (whereby it was to "come into force three months after the reception by the Secretary General of the instruments of ratification or adherence of a simple majority" of the OAU's member states), the African Charter on Human and Peoples' Rights came into effect on 21 October 1986– in honour of which 21 October was declared "African Human Rights Day".

Oversight and interpretation of the Charter is the task of the African Commission on Human and Peoples' Rights, which was set up on November 2, 1987 in Addis Ababa, Ethiopia and is now headquartered in Banjul, Gambia. A protocol to the Charter was subsequently adopted in 1998 whereby an African Court on Human and Peoples' Rights was to be created. The protocol came into effect on 25 January 2004.

In July 2004, the AU Assembly decided that the ACHP would be incorporated into the African Court of Justice.  In July 2005, the AU Assembly then decided that the ACHP should be operationalised despite the fact that the protocol establishing the African Court of Justice had not yet come into effect.  Accordingly, the Eighth Ordinary Session of the Executive Council of the African Union meeting in Khartoum, Sudan, on 22 January 2006, elected the first judges of the African Court on Human and Peoples' Rights.  The relationship between the newly created Court and the commission is yet to be determined.

As of 2019, 53 states have ratified the Charter.

Content 
The African Charter on Human and People's Rights includes preamble, 3 parts, 4 chapters, and 63 articles. The Charter followed the footsteps of the European and Inter-American systems by creating a regional human rights system for Africa. The Charter shares many features with other regional instruments, but also has notable unique characteristics concerning the norms it recognizes and also its supervisory mechanism.

The preamble commits to the elimination of Zionism, which it compares with colonialism and apartheid, caused South Africa to qualify its 1996 accession with the reservation that the Charter fall in line with the UN's resolutions "regarding the characterization of Zionism."

Norms contained in the Charter

Civil and Political Rights
The Charter recognizes most of what are regarded universally accepted civil and political rights. The civil and political rights recognized in the Charter include the right to freedom from discrimination (Article 2 and 18(3)), equality (Article 3), life and personal integrity (Article 4), dignity (Article 5), freedom from slavery (Article 5), freedom from cruel, inhuman or degrading treatment or punishment (Article 5), rights to due process concerning arrest and detention (Article 6), the right to a fair trial (Article 7 and 25), freedom of religion (Article 8), freedom of information and expression (Article 9), freedom of association (Article 10), freedom of assembly (Article 11), freedom of movement (Article 12), freedom to political participation (Article 13), the right to property (Article 14), and the right to resist (Article 20).

Some human rights scholars however consider the Charter's coverage of other civil and political rights to be inadequate. For example, the right to privacy or a right against forced or compulsory labour are not explicitly recognised. The provisions concerning fair trial and political participation are considered incomplete by international standards.

Economic, Social and Cultural Rights
The Charter also recognises certain economic, social and cultural rights, and overall the Charter is considered to place considerable emphasis on these rights. The Charter recognises right to work (Article 15), the right to health (Article 16), and the right to education (Article 17). Through a decision by the African Commission on Human and Peoples' Rights, SERAC v Nigeria (2001), the Charter is also understood to include a right to housing and a right to food as “implicit” in the Charter, particularly in light of its provisions on the right to life (Art. 4), right to health (Art. 16) and to development (Art. 22).

Peoples' Rights and Group Rights
In addition to recognising the individual rights mentioned above the Charter also recognises collective or group rights, or peoples' rights and third-generation human rights. As such the Charter recognises group rights to a degree not matched by the European or Inter-American regional human rights instruments. The Charter awards the family protection by the state (Article 18), while "peoples" have the right to equality (Article 19), the right to self-determination (Article 20), to freely dispose of their wealth and natural resources (Article 21), the right to development (Article 22), the right to peace and security (Article 23) and "a generally satisfactory environment" (Article 24).

Duties
The Charter not only awards rights to individuals and peoples, but also includes duties incumbent upon them. These duties are contained in Article 29 and are as follows:
 The duty to preserve the harmonious development of the family.
 To serve the national community by placing both physical and intellectual abilities at its service.
 Not to compromise the security of the State.
 To preserve and strengthen social and national solidarity.
 To preserve and strengthen national independence and the territorial integrity of one's country and to contribute to its defence.
 To work to the best of one's abilities and competence and to pay taxes in the interest of society.
 To preserve and strengthen positive African cultural values and in general to contribute to the promotion of the moral well-being of society.
 To contribute to the best of one's abilities to the promotion and achievement of African unity.

See also
 African Charter on the Rights and Welfare of the Child
 African Court on Human and Peoples' Rights
 African Union
 International human rights law
 Maputo Protocol
 List of Linguistic Rights in Constitutions (Africa)
 Linguistic rights
 United Nations General Assembly Resolution 3379

References

External links
African Charter on Human and Peoples' Rights
African Commission on Human and Peoples' Rights
Decisions of the Sixth Ordinary Session of the Executive Council

African Union
Human rights instruments
African Union treaties
Treaties concluded in 1981
Treaties entered into force in 1986
Treaties of Algeria
Treaties of the People's Republic of Angola
Treaties of the People's Republic of Benin
Treaties of Botswana
Treaties of Burkina Faso
Treaties of Burundi
Treaties of Cameroon
Treaties of Cape Verde
Treaties of the Central African Republic
Treaties of Chad
Treaties of the Comoros
Treaties of the Republic of the Congo
Treaties of Ivory Coast
Treaties of Zaire
Treaties of Djibouti
Treaties of Egypt
Treaties of Equatorial Guinea
Treaties of Eritrea
Treaties of Ethiopia
Treaties of Gabon
Treaties of the Gambia
Treaties of Ghana
Treaties of Guinea
Treaties of Guinea-Bissau
Treaties of Kenya
Treaties of Lesotho
Treaties of Liberia
Treaties of the Libyan Arab Jamahiriya
Treaties of Madagascar
Treaties of Malawi
Treaties of Mali
Treaties of Mauritania
Treaties of Mauritius
Treaties of the People's Republic of Mozambique
Treaties of Namibia
Treaties of Niger
Treaties of Nigeria
Treaties of Rwanda
Treaties of the Sahrawi Arab Democratic Republic
Treaties of São Tomé and Príncipe
Treaties of Senegal
Treaties of Seychelles
Treaties of Sierra Leone
Treaties of the Somali Democratic Republic
Treaties of South Africa
Treaties of South Sudan
Treaties of Tanzania
Treaties of the Republic of the Sudan (1985–2011)
Treaties of Eswatini
Treaties of Togo
Treaties of Tunisia
Treaties of Uganda
Treaties of Zambia
Treaties of Zimbabwe
1981 in the Gambia
African human rights system